Joltai is a commune and village in the Gagauz Autonomous Territorial Unit of the Republic of Moldova.  The 2004 census listed the commune as having a population of 2,278 people.   Gagauz total 2,187. Minorities included 158 Moldovans, 67 Russians, 33 Ukrainians, 14 Bulgarians, 2 Poles and 1 Jew.

Its geographical coordinates are 46° 10' 57" North, 28° 52' 34" East.

References

Joltai